The Memoirs of Naim Bey: Turkish Official Documents Relating to the Deportation and the Massacres of Armenians, containing the Talat Pasha telegrams, is a book published by historian and journalist Aram Andonian in 1919. Originally redacted in Armenian, it was popularized worldwide through the English edition published by Hodder & Stoughton of London. It includes several documents (telegrams) that constitute evidence that the Armenian genocide was formally implemented as Ottoman Empire policy.

The first edition in English had an introduction by Viscount Gladstone.

Contents 
According to Andonian, the documents were collected by an Ottoman official called Naim Bey, who was working in the Refugees Office in Aleppo, and handed by him to Andonian. Each note bears the signature of Mehmed Talaat Pasha, the Minister of Interior and later Grand Vizier of the Ottoman Empire. The contents of these telegrams "clearly states his intention to exterminate all Armenians, outlines the extermination plan, offers a guarantee of immunity for officials, calls for tighter censorship and draws special attention to the children in Armenian orphanages." The telegrams remain in coded form and are written in Ottoman Turkish.

The overall picture emerging from these narrations points to a network of the extermination for most of the deportees. It overwhelmingly confirms the fact of what British historian Arnold J. Toynbee (LSE, University of London) called "this gigantic crime that devastated the Near East".

Authenticity 

In 1983, the Turkish Historical Association published a now discredited work titled "Ermenilerce Talat Pasa’ya Atfedilen Telgraflarin Gercek Yüzü" by Şinasi Orel and Süreyya Yuca. In the introduction to "The Talat Pasha Telegrams: Historical Fact or Armenian Fiction", its English-language edition published in 1985, Orel and Yuca wrote that the term "genocide" and the term "massacres" were being wrongly applied to characterize the Armenian genocide (which its authors describe as an Armenian "claim" and a "calumny directed against Turkey"), and that the documents contained within The Memoirs of Naim Bey were forgeries that had been, for more than 60 years, used as the basis for those charges of genocide and massacre.

The French historian Yves Ternon who convened at the 1984 Permanent Peoples' Tribunal contends that these telegrams however, "were authenticated by experts…[but] they were sent back to Andonian in London and lost."

Historian Vahakn N. Dadrian argued in 1986 that the points brought forth by Turkish historians are misleading and countered the discrepancies they raised.

Scottish historian Niall Ferguson, professor of history at Harvard University, senior research fellow of Jesus College, University of Oxford, and senior fellow of the Hoover Institution, Stanford University, and Richard Albrecht among others also point to the fact that the court did not question the authenticity of the telegrams in 1921–which, however, were not introduced as evidence in court–and that the British had also intercepted numerous telegrams which directly "incriminated exchanges between Talaat and other Turkish officials", and that "one of the leading scientific experts, Vahakn N. Dadrian, in 1986, verified the documents as authentic telegrams send out by [...] Talat Pasha". He adds:

Historians Hans-Lukas Kieser and Margaret Lavinia Anderson wrote in 2019 that Dadrian's rebuttal to the charges of forgery "remains convincing".

Turkish historian Taner Akçam mentions similarities between the telegrams published by Andonian to extant Ottoman documents. In a book published in 2016, named “The Naim Efendi Memoirs and Talat Pasha Telegrams”, he states that the memoir and the telegrams are real. Akçam states that throughout his research he has discovered some serious new information and documents supporting his claim. Akçam summarizes them as following:

 There was, in fact, an Ottoman officer named Naim Efendi. The original Ottoman documents that prove this exist, and some of them are published in Akçam's book.
 There is a memoir that belongs to Naim Efendi. The microfiche copies of it, which he wrote in Ottoman in his own handwriting, are currently in Akçam’s possession. In his book he presents these pages as they are.
 The memoir is genuine and the information it provides is correct. It is possible to find documents in the Ottoman archives referring to the same events and people as the memoir does.
 Turkish historians Şinasi Orel and Süreyya Yuca stated that the use of lined paper in a telegram indicates that the document is a fake, because, according to them, the Ottoman bureaucracy did not use lined paper. Akçam presents evidence that during this particular time period the Ottoman bureaucracy did use lined paper and there are many documents in the Ottoman archives that show that the Internal Ministry’s numerous agencies were ordering lined paper.
 The telegrams that Naim Efendi sold to Andonian consist of two and three-digit codes. Orel and Yuca claim that during the war years the Ottoman government only used coding techniques that consisted of four and five-digit codes. Thus, they said, the telegrams were fake. Akçam presents evidence that during the war years the Ottoman government used numerical codes consisting of various different digit groupings to send orders via telegram. The texts he has discovered in the Ottoman archives used a series of two, three, four, and five-digit codes.

Revisionism

 and Süreyya Yuca claimed in their 1983 book The Talât Pasha "telegrams": historical fact or Armenian fiction? that Naim Bey did not exist, and his memoir and the telegrams were forgeries. According to Turkish historian Taner Akçam, their claims "were some of the most important cornerstones of denying the events of 1915" and "the book became one of the most important instruments for the anti-Armenian hate discourse". Akçam wrote a book, Killing Orders, in order to debunk the claims of Orel and Yuca and prove that the telegrams were authentic. In 2017, Akçam was able to access one of the original telegrams, archived in Jerusalem, which inquired about Armenian liquidation and elimination.

Guenter Lewy, a political scientist and genocide denier, also states that the telegrams form the "centerpiece" of "the case against the Turks", that the authenticity of the Naim-Andonian documents "will only be resolved through the discovery and publication of relevant Ottoman documents", and calls Orel and Yuca's work a "painstaking analysis of these documents" that makes "any use of them in a serious scholarly work unacceptable". About this position David B. MacDonald wrote that Lewy is content to rely on the work of "Turkish deniers Şinasi Orel and Sureyya Yuca": "Lewy's conception of shaky pillars echoes the work of Holocaust deniers, who also see Holocaust history resting on pillars... This is a dangerous proposition, because it assumes from the start that genocide scholarship rests on lies which can easily be disproved once a deeper examination of the historical 'truth' is undertaken".

Other opinions include Dutch professor Erik-Jan Zürcher (professor of Turkish studies at Leiden University) ; Zürcher does however point to many other corroborating documents supporting the Andonian Telegrams assertion of core involvement and premeditation of the killing by the central CUP members. Scholars who share revisionist opinions about the Andonian documents include Bernard Lewis (Professor Emeritus of Near Eastern Studies at Princeton University and Genocide denier), who classifies the "Talat Pasha telegrams" among the "celebrated historical fabrications", on the same level than The Protocols of the Elders of Zion, Andrew Mango (a biographer of Mustafa Kemal Atatürk) who speaks of "telegrams dubiously attributed to the Ottoman wartime Minister of the Interior, Talat Pasha", Paul Dumont (Professor of Turkish studies at Strasbourg University) who stated in one of his books that "the authenticity of the alleged telegrams of Ottoman government, ordering the destruction of Armenians is today seriously contested", Norman Stone (Bilkent University, Ankara, Turkey), who calls the Naim-Andonian book "a forgery"; and by Gilles Veinstein, professor of Ottoman and Turkish history at Collège de France, who considers the documents as "nothing but fakes".

Editions
 The Memoirs of Naim Bey: Turkish Official Documents Relating to the Deportation and the Massacres of Armenians, compiled by Aram Andonian, Hodder and Stoughton, London, ca. 1920
 Documents sur les massacres arméniens, Paris, 1920 (incomplete translation by M. S. David-Beg)
 Մեծ Ոճիրը (The Great Crime), Armenian language edition, Hairenik, Boston, 1921

Note: Although the Armenian edition was published after the other two versions, historian Vahakn Dadrian states that the Armenian text constitutes the original that Aram Andonian wrote back in 1919. Taking into account the delay in its publication helps to explain some "errors" identified by some Turkish authors in dating the documents.

See also 
 Witnesses and testimonies of the Armenian genocide
 Johannes Lepsius

References

Bibliography

External links 
Enquête sur la négation d'un génocide. An analysis of the Andonian telegrams 
Primary Documents: Talaat Pasha's Alleged Official Orders Regarding the Armenian Massacres, March 1915-January 1916 - Translated versions of these telegrams

History books about Armenia
Non-fiction books about the Armenian genocide
Books about the Ottoman Empire
Naim Bey
Forgery controversies
1920 non-fiction books
Hodder & Stoughton books
Talaat Pasha